Eden Gray (June 9, 1901 – January 14, 1999), was the professional name of Priscilla Pardridge, an American actress, and  writer on the esoteric meanings of tarot cards and their use in fortune-telling.

Life 
She was the daughter of Albert Jerome Pardridge.

She was born and raised in Chicago.  She changed her name when she moved to New York in the early 1920s when she began her acting career. Her acting career was temporarily put on hold during World War II when she became a lab technician with the Woman's Army Corps.  She also earned a Doctorate of Divinity degree from the First Church of Religious Science in New York.  She opened a bookstore in the 1950s called Inspiration House Publishing, selling books on the occult and metaphysical issues.  In the 1950s she wrote "Tarot Revealed" which was an introductory work to the tarot.  She moved to Vero Beach, Florida in 1971.  She was a member of the Vero Beach Art Club, Riverside Theater and Theater Guild.

In the 1960s, through her books, Gray had an integral part in the creation of the contemporary interest in esoteric Tarot in general, and the Waite–Smith Tarot deck and the Fool's Journey interpretation of the Tarot trump cards in particular. 

She was married to Lester Cohen and had a son, Peter Gray Cohen.  Peter was also known as Peter Gray.  She was survived by her grandson, Daniel H. Cohen, the professional water marbler. He lives to share her legacy.

She was 97 years old when she died in a Florida hospital on 14 Jan 1999.

Works
 Tarot Revealed: A Modern Guide to Reading the Tarot Cards. Inspiration House, New York, 1960. reprinted, Signet Books 1969
 Recognition: Themes on Inner Perception, Inspiration House, 1969
 A Complete Guide to the Tarot. Bantam Books and Crown Publishers, New York, 1970
 Mastering the Tarot: Basic Lessons in an Ancient, Mystic Art. Crown Publishers, New York, 1971

Dutch editions
Het geheim van de Tarot: de magische kaarten die verleden en toekomst onthullen, translated by Wim Gijsen, Kosmos-Z&K, 1996

Spanish editions
Guía completa para el Tarot, Editorial Diana, Mexico, 1976

Partial filmography
Lovers in Quarantine (1925)
The Man Who Lost Himself (1941)

References

Sources
Birth information is from the 1910 U.S. Census (on Ancestry.com) and death information is from the Social Security Death Index, also on Ancestry.com.
Father's identity is from a news article in the Chicago Tribune, 13 Nov 1934, page 17.

External links

American occultists
Cartomancy
1901 births
1999 deaths
Tarot readers